The Taksim German Hospital is a health care institution in Cihangir, Istanbul which is owned by the Universal Hospitals Group since 1992. It was closed for a three-year refurbishment and re-opened in 1995. The hospital had around 300 beds. It shut down most of its clinics during 2013 and closed its doors indefinitely following a temporary, one-month closure in 2014.

The hospital was founded in 1852 by three nurses working to the model of German Pastor Theodor Fliedner.

References

External links
 soL, 16 June 2013, water cannon attack on German Hospital during 2013 Gezi Park protests
 tear gas attack on German Hospital during 2013 Gezi Park protests

Hospitals in Istanbul
Hospitals established in 1852
Beyoğlu
1852 establishments in the Ottoman Empire